John Goldsmith may refer to: 
 John Goldsmith (cricketer) (1766–1845), English first-class cricketer 
 John Goldsmith (footballer) (born 1931), Australian rules footballer
 John Goldsmith (linguist), American linguist
 John G. Goldsmith (1909-1972), British agent for the Special Operations Executive during World War II
 Jonathan Goldsmith (musician), Canadian musician, arranger, producer and composer.
 Jack Goldsmith (born 1962), American attorney and Harvard Law School professor

See also
Goldsmith Book Prize, literary award for books published in the United States.